Dominik Rohracker (born 9 January 1989) is a German footballer who plays as a midfielder or forward for SV Elversberg.

Career

Rohracker came through the youth setup of Bayern Munich, and broke into the reserve team with a couple of appearances in the Regionalliga Süd at the beginning of the 2007–08 season. In the summer of 2008, he travelled with Bayern's first-team on a pre-season tour of Asia, as many players had not returned from Euro 2008, and he featured in a friendly against the Indonesia national team, as a last-minute substitute for Jan Schlaudraff.

Despite this, Rohracker didn't make his debut in the 3. Liga until April 2009, when he replaced Stefan Rieß in a 2–1 win over Jahn Regensburg. He made 21 more appearances for Bayern Munich II without getting on the score sheet, before being released by the club in July 2010, and signing for SV Sandhausen. He made nineteen appearances in his first season for the club, scoring twice, but only played the first eight matches of the following season as Sandhausen won the 3. Liga title. He was released on a free transfer, and returned to Munich to sign for SpVgg Unterhaching, where he was a first-team regular during the 2012–13 season. He signed for SV Elversberg in August 2013.

Honours
3. Liga: 2012

External links

1989 births
Living people
German footballers
FC Bayern Munich II players
SV Sandhausen players
SpVgg Unterhaching players
SV Elversberg players
3. Liga players
Association football midfielders
Association football forwards
People from Burghausen, Altötting
Sportspeople from Upper Bavaria
Footballers from Bavaria
FK Pirmasens players